Sir Thomas Pym Hales, 4th Baronet ( – 18 March 1773), of Beakesbourne in Kent, was an English member of parliament.

Hales was the eldest son of Sir Thomas Hales, 3rd Baronet, a long-serving Member of Parliament who held a series of lucrative posts in the Royal Household. He succeeded to his father's baronetcy on 6 October 1762. Earlier the same year, he had entered Parliament as member for Downton, a pocket borough under the control of his brother-in-law Lord Feversham. He initially supported the government, but in February 1764 he voted with the opposition over the use of general warrants in the Wilkes case, and seems to have been henceforth regarded as of doubtful loyalties.

He did not stand for re-election in 1768, but returned to the Commons at a by-election at Dover in January 1770, as the government-backed candidate, and remained its MP for the remaining three years of his life.

He married Mary Heyward, daughter of Gervase Heyward of Sandwich, in 1764, and they had five daughters:
 Mary Anne Hales (born 1765)
 Jane Hales (born 1766), married Henry Bridges (1769–1855), who later changed his name to Brook
 Elizabeth Hales (born 1769), married John Calcraft of Rempston
 Harriet Hales (born 1770)
 Caroline Hales (1772–1853), married Colonel the Hon. William John Gore (1767–1836)

When Sir Thomas died in 1773, the baronetcy passed to his younger brother, Philip.

References
 
 Hales genealogy
Robert Beatson, A Chronological Register of Both Houses of Parliament (London: Longman, Hurst, Res & Orme, 1807) 
 Lewis Namier & John Brooke, The History of Parliament: The House of Commons 1754–1790 (London: HMSO, 1964)

|-

1773 deaths
1720s births
Baronets in the Baronetage of England
Members of the Parliament of Great Britain for Dover
Whig (British political party) MPs for English constituencies
British MPs 1761–1768
British MPs 1768–1774
People from Bekesbourne